Micron Memory Japan, K.K.  is a Japanese subsidiary of Micron Technology. It was formerly known as  established in 1999 that developed, designed, manufactured and sold dynamic random-access memory (DRAM) products. It was also a semiconductor foundry. With headquarters in Yaesu, Chūō, Tokyo, Japan, it was initially formed under the name NEC Hitachi Memory in 1999 by the merger of the Hitachi and NEC DRAM businesses. In the following year it took on the name Elpida.  In 2003, Elpida took over the Mitsubishi DRAM business. In 2004, it listed its shares in the first section of the Tokyo Stock Exchange. In 2012, those shares were delisted as a result of its bankruptcy. In 2013, Elpida was acquired by Micron Technology. On February 28, 2014, Elpida changed its name to Micron Memory Japan and Elpida Akita changed its name to Micron Akita, Inc.

History

Elpida Memory was founded in 1999 as a merger of NEC's and Hitachi's DRAM operations and began development operations for DRAM products in 2000. Both companies also spun off their other semiconductor operations into Renesas.

In 2001, the company began construction of its 300mm wafer fabrication plant. Later that year, it began sales operations in domestic markets.

In 2003, the company took over Mitsubishi Electric Corporation's DRAM operations and employed Mitsubishi development engineers.

In 2004, Elpida Memory went public and was listed on the Tokyo Stock Exchange.

In 2006, the company established Akita Elpida to take on the development of advanced back-end technology processes.

In March 2006, Elpida reported consolidated sales of 241,500,000,000 Japanese yen. It employed 3196 people.

In 2002, armed with the Sherman Antitrust Act, the United States Department of Justice began a probe into the activities of dynamic random access memory (DRAM) manufacturers. US computer makers, including Dell and Gateway, claimed that inflated DRAM pricing was causing lost profits and hindering their effectiveness in the marketplace. To date, five manufacturers have pleaded guilty to their involvement in an international price-fixing conspiracy including Hynix, Infineon, Micron Technology, Samsung, and Elpida. Micron Technology was not fined for its involvement due to co-operation with investigators.

The company received 140 billion yen in financial aid and loans from the Japanese government and banks during the financial crisis in 2009.

On April 3, 2010, Elpida Memory sold ¥18.5billion worth of shares to Kingston Technology

On April 22, 2010, Elpida announced it had developed the world's first four-gigabit DDR3 SDRAM. Based on a 40 nm process, this DRAM was said to use about thirty percent less power compared to two 40 nm process two-gigabit DDR3 SDRAMs. It was to operate at both standard DDR3 1.5 V and 1.35 V to further reduce power consumption.

In July 2011, Elpida announced that it planned to raise $987 million by selling shares and bonds. In August 2011, Elpida claimed to be the first memory maker to begin sampling 25 nm DRAMs.

On February 27, 2012, Elpida filed for bankruptcy. 
With liabilities of 448 billion yen (US$5.5 billion), the company's bankruptcy was Japan's largest since Japan Airlines bankrupted in January 2010. The company suffered from both strong yen and a sharp drop of DRAM prices as a result of stagnant demand of personal computers and disruption of computer production caused by flooding of HDD factories in Thailand. DRAM prices plunged to a record low in 2011 as the price of the benchmark DDR3 2-gigabit DRAM declined 85%. Elpida was the third largest DRAM maker, held 18 percent of the market by revenue in 2011.

On March 28, 2012, Elpida was delisted from the Tokyo Stock Exchange.  At the time, Elpida was one of the suppliers of SDRAM components for the A6 processor in the Apple iPhone 5.

In February 2013, Tokyo court and Elpida creditors approved an acquisition by Micron Technology.

The company became a fully owned subsidiary of Micron Technology on July 31, 2013.

Effective February 28, 2014, Elpida changed its name to Micron Memory Japan and Elpida Akita changed its name to Micron Akita, Inc.

Products
 DDR4 SDRAM
 DDR2 SDRAM
 DDR3 SDRAM
 Mobile RAM
 GDDR5
 XDR DRAM

Locations
Micron has two design centers, one manufacturing plant/technology development site, and two sales offices in Japan:

The Hiroshima Plant is key to Micron's efforts to develop low-power DRAM products essential to smartphones and other mobile devices. Once these products achieve yield and performance targets (optimal cost structure, quality and lower end-to-end product cycle time) in Hiroshima, the manufacturing process can then be transferred to other sites. 

Micron's realignment of the Japanese operations included the following:
 $2 billion investment in Hiroshima to enhance competitive capabilities
 Sell-off of its test and assembly capabilities in Micron Akita to Powertech Technology, Inc. (PTI), a Taiwanese semiconductor assembly, packaging and testing company
 Sell-off of its equity stake in Tera Probe to PTI
With these changes, Micron's DRAM test and assembly capabilities would be based in Hiroshima and Taiwan.

See also
 Renesas Electronics
 Numonyx

References

External links 
 

 

Computer memory companies
Manufacturing companies based in Tokyo
Semiconductor companies of Japan
Companies formerly listed on the Tokyo Stock Exchange
Electronics companies established in 1999
Japanese companies established in 1999
Companies that have filed for bankruptcy in Japan
Japanese subsidiaries of foreign companies
2004 initial public offerings
2013 mergers and acquisitions
Micron Technology